= Portrait of Floris Soop =

1654 painting by Rembrandt

- The Standard Bearer
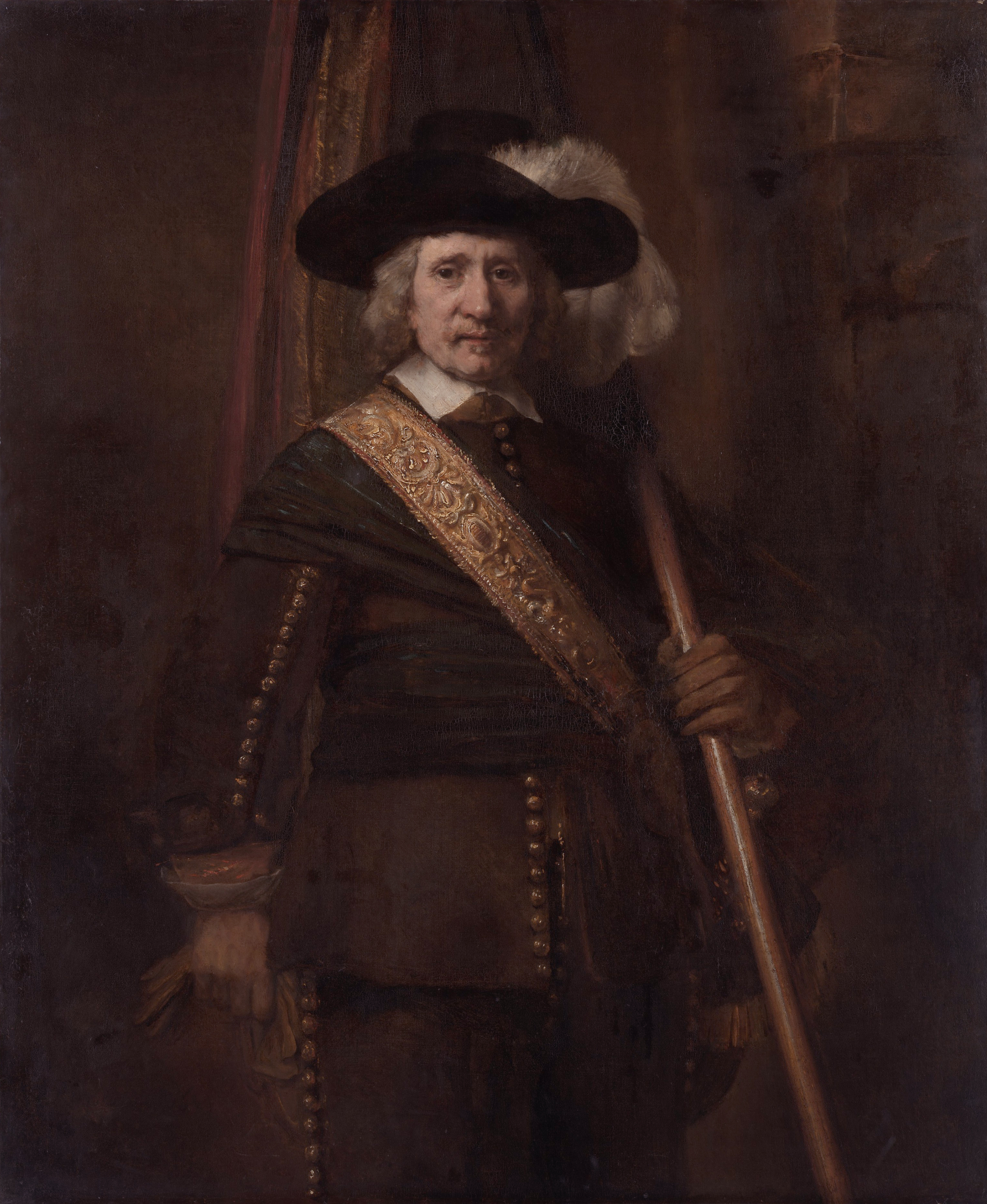
- Artist: Rembrandt
- Year: 1654
- Medium: Oil on canvas
- Dimensions: 140.3 cm × 114.9 cm (55.2 in × 45.2 in)
- Location: Metropolitan Museum of Art, New York City
- Accession: 49.7.35

Portrait of Floris Soop or The Standard Bearer is a 1654 oil on canvas portrait by Rembrandt, now in the Metropolitan Museum of Art, New York.

The flag, the plume in the hat, and the tooled leather baldric (sword-belt worn over shoulder) indicate that the subject is an ensign in one of Amsterdam's civic guard companies. He is almost certainly Floris Soop, a wealthy bachelor who owned some 140 paintings.

The work is currently (2018) not on view.

== Sources ==
- http://www.metmuseum.org/collection/the-collection-online/search/437395
